Nettleton High School is a comprehensive four-year public high school located in Jonesboro, Arkansas, United States. It is one of eight public high schools in Craighead County, Arkansas and the only high school managed by the Nettleton School District. It serves as the main feeder school for Nettleton Junior High School.

Curriculum 
The assumed course of study at Nettleton High School  is the Smart Core curriculum developed by the Arkansas Department of Education.  Students are engaged in regular and Advanced Placement (AP) coursework and exams prior to graduation, with the opportunity for qualified students to be named honor graduates based on grade point average and additional coursework above minimum requirements. The school administers vocational classes through Jonesboro High School (Arkansas). Nettleton High School has been accredited since 1965 by AdvancED.

Extracurricular activities

Athletics 
For 2012–14, the Nettleton Raiders participate in the 5A East Conference administered by the Arkansas Activities Association (AAA).  The Raiders compete in interscholastic competition including baseball, basketball (boys/girls), competitive cheer, competitive dance, cross country, football, golf (boys/girls), soccer (boys/girls), softball, swimming and diving (boys/girls), track and field (boys/girls) and volleyball.

 Volleyball: The Lady Raiders volleyball team are 3-time state volleyball champions (1987, 2010, 2012). In 2012, Nettleton defeated Little Rock Christian (18-25, 25–22, 25–19, 25–19) to win the 5A State Volleyball Championship.
 Spirit: The competitive dance team won the 5A classification's state dance championship in 2010, 2011, and 2012.
 Basketball: Led by Jerry Rook, the Raiders basketball team won a state basketball championship in 1961.
 Softball: The Lady Raiders softball team won a state (slowpitch) softball championship in 1997, followed by two state (fastpitch) softball championships in 2002 and 2008.
 Tennis: The boys tennis team are 2-time state tennis champions (1985, 2002).

Clubs and traditions 
The Nettleton High School mascot is the Raider and the school colors are black and Vegas gold.

The Nettleton Quiz Bowl team placed 2nd at the 2017 AGQBA State Tournament

Notable alumni 
 Jerry Rook (1961) – professional basketball player
 James W. Pardew (1962) – United States Ambassador to Bulgaria
 Angie Craig – member-elect to the United States House of Representatives
 Corey Ragsdale (2001) – professional baseball coach

References

External links 

 

Public high schools in Arkansas
Schools in Craighead County, Arkansas
Buildings and structures in Jonesboro, Arkansas
Jonesboro, Arkansas